These are the results for the girls' doubles event at the 2010 Summer Youth Olympics.

Seeds 

  /  (semifinals, bronze medalists)
  /  (quarterfinals)
  /  (quarterfinals)
  /  (final, silver medalists)

Draw

Finals

Top half

Bottom half

References 
 Draws

Tennis at the 2010 Summer Youth Olympics